Krotoszyn  (Krotoshin) is a town in west-central Poland with 30,010 inhabitants . It has been part of the Greater Poland Voivodeship since 1999; it was within Kalisz Voivodeship from 1975 to 1998.

History

Krotoszyn was founded by local nobleman , participant of the Battle of Grunwald, and was granted town rights in 1415 by King Władysław II Jagiełło. It was a private town owned by the Krotoski, Niewieski, Rozdrażewski and Potocki families, historically located in the Kalisz Voivodeship in the Greater Poland Province of the Polish Crown. After the town suffered a fire in 1453, King Casimir IV of Poland vested it with new privileges, establishing a weekly market and three annual fairs.

It developed as a regional center of trade and crafts, located at the intersection of the Kalisz–Głogów and Toruń–Wrocław trade routes. During the Thirty Years' War, in 1628, Protestant refugees from German states settled in the town. It was plundered by the Swedes, during the Swedish invasion of Poland in 1656, but soon recovered and famous fairs were held there.

It was annexed by Prussia in 1793 during the Second Partition of Poland. In 1807 regained by Poles as part of the short-lived Duchy of Warsaw, in 1815 it was re-annexed by Prussia, and in 1871 it subsequently became part of Germany. During the German rule in the 19th century, the town was located in the Prussian province of Posen. The castle of Krotoszyn was the centre of a mediatised principality formed in 1819 out of the holdings of the Prussian crown and granted to the prince of Thurn und Taxis in compensation for his relinquishing control over the Prussian postal system and it was subjected to Germanisation. Famous Polish composer Fryderyk Chopin stopped in the town in 1829. During the Polish Greater Poland uprising (1848) Germans and Jews attacked the local Polish committee, and the Poles had to move their activities to Koźmin Wielkopolski. Later on, despite the Germanisation policies, Poles established a number of organizations, including an industrial society, a cooperative bank and a local branch of the "Sokół" Polish Gymnastic Society.

Many inhabitants took part in the Greater Poland uprising (1918–19), during which the town was liberated by the insurgents on 1 January 1919, nearly two months after Poland regained its independence.

World War II

The Germans attacked Krotoszyn on 1 September 1939, the first day of the invasion of Poland and World War II. On 2 September they bombed a train with Polish civilians fleeing the Wehrmacht from Krotoszyn, killing 300 people and on 3 September they captured the town. The Germans established a transit camp for Polish prisoners of war and over 4,500 Polish soldiers passed through the camp. In mid-September 1939, the Einsatzgruppe VI entered the town to commit various crimes against the Polish population.

During the German occupation the Polish population was subjected to mass arrests, Germanisation policies, discrimination, expulsions, executions and deportations to forced labour in Germany. Poles from Krotoszyn, including several local policemen and the town's deputy mayor, as well as several alumni of local schools, were also murdered by the Russians in the large Katyn massacre in April–May 1940. The Germans destroyed the memorial dedicated to local Polish insurgents of 1918–1919, while another monument plaque was hidden by Poles and thus preserved. Germany also established and operated a Nazi prison in the town. Nevertheless, local Poles managed to organize the underground resistance movement, which included secret Polish teaching, scout troops, a local branch of the Home Army, the Secret Military Organization and structures of the Polish Underground State. Independent underground Polish press was issued in the town.

The town was liberated by Soviet troops and local Poles in January 1945 and restored to Poland, although with a Soviet-installed communist regime, which then stayed in power until the Fall of Communism in the 1980s. Some members of the Polish resistance movement were persecuted by the communists after the war.

Economy
The dominant trade is in grain and seeds, and the headquarters of the Polish branch of Mahle GmbH is located there.

Cuisine
The officially protected traditional food originating from Krotoszyn is wędzonka krotoszyńska, a type of Polish smoked pork meat (as designated by the Ministry of Agriculture and Rural Development of Poland). Local traditions of meat production date back hundreds of years, and the first butchers' guilds were established shortly after granting town rights in the early 15th century.

Sports
The main sports club of the town is Astra Krotoszyn with football and volleyball sections.

Notable people
Agnieszka Duczmal (born 1946), Polish conductor
Martin A. Couney (1869–1950), American obstetrician
Katarzyna Grochola (born 1957), Polish writer
Georg Huth (1867–1906), German Orientalist
Isidor Kalisch (1816–1886), reform rabbi
Judah Aryeh ben Zvi Hirsch, French Hebraist
Theodor Kullak (1818–1882), German pianist and composer
Marian Langiewicz (1827–1887), Polish military leader of the January Uprising
Marcin Lijewski (born 1977), Polish handball player
Otto Roquette (1824–1896), German author
Władysław Rybakowski (1885-1952), Polish social and political activist
Maria Siemionow (born 1950), world-renowned Polish scientist and microsurgeon
Melitta von Stauffenberg (born Schiller) (1903–1945), German test pilot of WWII
Louis Weissbein (1831-1913), architect, immigrated to the United States in 1854
David Zvi Banet (1893–1973), Orientalist and Professor of Arabic Studies at the Hebrew University in Jerusalem
Łukasz Kaczmarek (born 1994), Polish volleyball player

International relations

Twin towns – Sister cities
Krotoszyn is twinned with:
  Bucak, Turkey
  Brummen, Netherlands
  Fontenay le Comte, France
  Dierdorf, Germany
  Maišiagala, Lithuania
  Fonyód, Hungary

Gallery

References

Mangabay Population Listing

Cities and towns in Greater Poland Voivodeship
Krotoszyn County
Poznań Voivodeship (1921–1939)